FK Kruoja Pakruojis was a Lithuanian football club from the city of Pakruojis. The team first played in the A Lyga, Lithuania's top football division, in 2009. They were promoted after FBK Kaunas and Atlantas Klaipėda voluntarily withdrew. The team's colours are yellow and blue. The club plays at Pakruojis stadium (capacity 2000).
In August 2015, Kruoja withdrew from A Lyga.

European record

Notes
 1Q: First qualifying round

Players

Managers
 Aidas Dambrauskas (July 1, 2009–10)
 Albertas Klimavičius (Jan 1, 2011 – Aug 7, 2011)
 Aidas Dambrauskas (2012–1?)
 Sébastien Roques (Jan 1, 2013 – March 20, 2013)
 Vladimir Cheburin (Feb 21, 2014–Dec, 2014)
  Divaldo Da Silva  (Jan 2015 – Jun 2015)
 Aidas Dambrauskas   July 1, 2015– Aug 2015)

References

Defunct football clubs in Lithuania
Football clubs in Pakruojis
2016 disestablishments in Lithuania
Association football clubs disestablished in 2016
Association football clubs established in 2001
2001 establishments in Lithuania